Musa Khan may refer to:
 Musa Khan (general) (1908–1991), commander in chief of Pakistan's army
 Musa Khan Ahmadzai (born 1956), governor of Ghazni Province, Afghanistan
 Musa Khan of Bengal, ruler of Bengal from 1599 to 1611
 Muhammad Musa (born 2000), Pakistani cricketer, also known as Musa Khan

See also 
 Moosa Khan, a 2001 Pakistani film
 Musakhan, a Palestinian chicken dish